The Bay Area Pelican Rugby Football Club (RFC), commonly referred to as Pelican Rugby is a men's rugby club in the Tampa-St. Petersburg Metropolitan Area.  The team was founded in St. Petersburg, Florida in 1977.

The team consists of non-professional players and is sanctioned by USA Rugby to compete in men's Division III. The club is registered with the national governing rugby body and competes in the Florida Rugby Union (FRU) Division 2 and Division 4.

References

External links
 Official Site
 Pelican U19's
 Florida Rugby Union
 USA Rugby South
 USA Rugby
 Malakai Delai

Sports in St. Petersburg, Florida
Rugby clubs established in 1977
Rugby union teams in Florida
1977 establishments in Florida